Long Beach 2 Fillmoe is the first collaborative album by American rappers Daz Dillinger & JT the Bigga Figga. It was released on January 16, 2001 via D1A Records/Get Low Recordz/D.P.G. Recordz. The album was a minor success, making it to #70 on the Top R&B/Hip-Hop Albums and #30 on Independent Albums, however no charting singles were released from the album.

Track listing

Charts

References

External links

2001 albums
Daz Dillinger albums
JT the Bigga Figga albums
Collaborative albums